Hernán Eduardo Boyero (born December 30, 1979 in Río Segundo, Córdoba Province) is a retired Argentine-Bolivian football striker. Boyero is best remembered for his time at Blooming, where he netted 92 goals in 207 league matches, becoming a club legend due to his great eye for goal and the intensity he always played with.

Club career
Boyero started his playing career in 2002 with Instituto Atlético Central Córdoba in the Primera B Nacional, which is part of the regionalized second division in Argentina. At the end of the 2003 season, Instituto gained promotion to the Argentine Primera División; however; the team only survived one season and was relegated in 2004. The following year Boyero joined Juventud Antoniana, and not long after he transferred to Tigre, where he made a short spell before returning to Instituto to play until the conclusion of the 2006 season.

In February 2007, Boyero went abroad signing for Bolivian first division club Blooming. Since his debut with the celestes, he became an emblematic figure for the club and a favourite with the Blooming fans because of his commitment on the pitch.

In  January 2010, he was loaned out to Colombian club Millonarios for a six-month period, but the club chose not to take up their option to purchase, and the player returned to Blooming. On July 25, 2013, Boyero officially naturalized Bolivian.

On July 27, 2013 and after having played six years with Blooming, Boyero returned to his native country to fulfill his dream of playing in Primera División with club Argentinos Juniors under manager Ricardo Caruso Lombardi, who previously coached him at Tigre. He made 25 appearances and scored 6 goals playing for El Bicho. After the team was relegated to Primera B Nacional, Boyero transferred to Tristán Suárez in July 2014.  A knee injury expedited his retirement from football five months later at age 35.

Club titles

References

External links
 
 
 
 

1979 births
Living people
Sportspeople from Córdoba Province, Argentina
Association football forwards
Argentine footballers
Argentine expatriate sportspeople in Bolivia
Argentine Primera División players
Categoría Primera A players
Instituto footballers
Club Atlético Tigre footballers
Club Blooming players
Expatriate footballers in Bolivia
Millonarios F.C. players
Argentinos Juniors footballers
CSyD Tristán Suárez footballers
Club Blooming managers
Expatriate footballers in Colombia
Argentine expatriate footballers
Argentine football managers